The Yapacana antbird (Aprositornis disjuncta) is a species of passerine bird in the family Thamnophilidae. It is found in far eastern Colombia, southern Venezuela and northern Brazil. Its natural habitat is subtropical or tropical moist lowland forests.

The Yapacana antbird was originally described by the American ornithologist Herbert Friedmann in 1945 and given the binomial name Myrmeciza disjuncta. A molecular phylogenetic study published in 2013 found that the genus Myrmeciza, as then defined, was polyphyletic. In the resulting rearrangement to create monophyletic genera the Yapacana antbird was moved to its own genus Aprositornis. The name of the genus combines the Ancient Greek words aprositos "unapproachable" or "hard to get at" and ornis "bird".

References

Yapacana antbird
Birds of the Venezuelan Amazon
Birds of the Amazon Basin
Yapacana antbird
Yapacana antbird
Taxonomy articles created by Polbot